Inside a Dream may refer to:

 Inside a Dream (EP), a 2017 EP by Echosmith
 "Inside a Dream" (song), a 1988 song by Jane Wiedlin
 "Inside a Dream", a 2013 song by Pet Shop Boys